Ancistrus bufonius is a species of catfish in the family Loricariidae. It is native to South America, where it occurs in the Apurímac River basin in Peru. The species reaches 11.5 cm (4.5 inches) SL.

References 

bufonius
Fish described in 1840
Fauna of Peru
Taxa named by Achille Valenciennes
Catfish of South America